Humber-Bay of Islands is a provincial electoral district for the House of Assembly of Newfoundland and Labrador, Canada. As of 2015, the district has 13,412 eligible voters.

It contains the towns of Irishtown, Hughes Brook, Summerside, Meadows, Gillams, McIvers, Cox's Cove, Mount Moriah, York Harbour, Lark Harbour, and Humber Arm South (Benoit's Cove, Frenchmen's Cove, Halfway Point, and Wood's Island).

While historically, the Curling area of Corner Brook was part of the district. The district was reconfigured in 2015 to include the Humbermouth area of the City of Corner Brook, while maintaining the north and south shores of the Bay of Islands and the Curling area of the city. The Humbermouth area of Corner Brook was previously included in the district of Humber East.

While not a wealthy district, Humber-Bay of Islands is more economically vibrant than other rural districts. Its economy is driven by the fishery and tourism, to a limited extent. Many residents work in Corner Brook.

This district was home to back-to-back premiers. Immediately after becoming leader of the Liberals, Brian Tobin chose this district, vacated by Clyde Wells. Former Liberal Cabinet Minister Eddie Joyce is currently MHA; he was re-elected as an Independent in 2019.

Members of the House of Assembly
The district has elected the following Members of the House of Assembly:

Election results

Humber-Bay of Islands

Bay of Islands

|-

|-

|-
 
|NDP
|Dave (Bud) Quigley
|align="right"|214 
|align="right"|3.64
|align="right"|-7.64
|}

|-

|-

|-
 
|NDP
|Israel Hann  
|align="right"|620
|align="right"|11.28
|align="right"|+4.43
|}

|-

|-

|-
 
|NDP
|Hayward Pardy 
|align="right"|417
|align="right"|6.85
|align="right"|
|}

External links 
Website of the Newfoundland and Labrador House of Assembly
 Newfoundland & Labrardor Votes 2007. Canadian Broadcasting Corporation.

References

Corner Brook
Newfoundland and Labrador provincial electoral districts